Flotsam and Jetsam is a compilation album of B-sides, remixes and rarities by English rock musician Peter Gabriel. It was released on 13 September 2019 in digital stores and on streaming services only.

Track listing 
Source

Omissions 
Notable non-album tracks missing from this compilation include:
 "Out Out" (Gremlins: Music from the Motion Picture, 1984)
 "No More Apartheid" (Artists United Against Apartheid Sun City, 1985)
 "Lovetown" (Philadelphia (Music from the Motion Picture), 1993; also on Hit)
 "While the Earth Sleeps" (Strange Days (Music from the Motion Picture), 1995)
 "Seven Zero" (Real World CD-Extra #2, 1996)

References

External links 
 
 
 
 

Peter Gabriel albums
Compilation albums by English artists
2019 compilation albums
Real World Records compilation albums
Republic Records compilation albums
Virgin EMI Records albums
B-side compilation albums